Daniel Radu can refer to:

 Daniel Radu (boxer) (born 1959), a Romanian boxer
 Daniel Radu (judoka) (born 1957), a Romanian judoka
 Daniel Radu (water polo) (born 1977), a Romanian water polo player

See also
 Dan Ghica-Radu